Labette County High School is a public high school in Altamont, Kansas, United States, operated by Labette County USD 506 school district.  It is located at 601 South High School Street.

History
The school was founded in 1895.   In 1968, Look magazine did a feature story on the school.

Overview
Enrollment is about 510 students with approximately 20 percent categorized as minority.  The Grizzlies are the school's mascot and the school colors are red and gold.  The Labetta is the school newspaper and the school also produces a podcast called the Labetta Encore.  Extracurricular activities include chess club, math club, art club, cheer, and sports teams such as girls' golf.

See also
 List of high schools in Kansas
 List of unified school districts in Kansas

References

External links
 High School website

Schools in Labette County, Kansas
Public high schools in Kansas
1895 establishments in Kansas